Leonidas Kormalis (6 November 1932 - September 2003) was a Greek former sprinter who competed in the 1960 Summer Olympics. He was also part of Greece's winning 4×400 metres relay team at the 1959 Mediterranean Games.

References

External links
 

1932 births
Living people
Greek male sprinters
Olympic athletes of Greece
Athletes (track and field) at the 1960 Summer Olympics
Athletes from Athens
Athletes (track and field) at the 1959 Mediterranean Games
Mediterranean Games gold medalists for Greece
Mediterranean Games medalists in athletics
20th-century Greek people
2003 deaths